United Left of the Community of Madrid (IU–CM or IUCM) was the regional branch in the Community of Madrid of United Left until 2015. The party was expelled from the main organization in June 2015.

Political parties in the Community of Madrid
Political parties established in 1986
United Left (Spain)
1986 establishments in Spain
Political parties disestablished in 2015